The Opel Master Cup was association football tournament that mainly featured teams sponsored by car manufacturer Opel. It was held five times in different formats. The competition's first edition was held in 1996, and the following ones were held in 1997, 1999 (two times) and 2000. In 1996 and 1999 three teams competed in a round-robin tournament. In 1997 and 2000 four teams competed in a single elimination tournament with third place playoff. The first fourth editions of the cup had 45 minutes matches while the 2000 edition had regular 90 minutes matches.

Winners

References 

Defunct international club association football competitions in Europe
French football friendly trophies
German football friendly trophies